Masaki Oya (大宅 真樹, born 23 April 1995) is a Japanese male volleyball player. He plays for Japan men's national volleyball team and the Suntory Sunbirds in V.League 1, where he has served as captain since 2020–21 season. He was formerly the Japan U-23 national team's captain.

Clubs 
   (2011–2014)
  University of East Asia (2014–2019)
  Suntory Sunbirds (2019–present)

National teams 
 Japan men's national under-19 volleyball team (2012–2013)
 2012 Asian Youth Boys Volleyball Championship
 2013 FIVB Volleyball Boys' U19 World Championship
 Japan men's national under-21 volleyball team (2014)
 2014 Asian Men's U20 Volleyball Championship
 Japan men's national under-23 volleyball team (2017)
 2017 Asian Men's U23 Volleyball Championship
 2017 FIVB Volleyball Men's U23 World Championship
 Japan men's national volleyball team (2018, 2020–present)

Awards

Individual Awards
2021-2022 V.League Division 1 - MVP

Club teams 
 2020-21 V. League —  Champion, with Suntory Sunbirds
 2021-22 V. League —  Champion, with Suntory Sunbirds
 2022 Asian Men's Club Volleyball Championship —  Silver medal, with Suntory Sunbirds

Junior national team 
 2012 Asian Youth Boys Volleyball Championship –  Bronze Medal
 2017 Asian Men's U23 Volleyball Championship –  Runner-up

References 

1995 births
Living people
Sportspeople from Nagasaki Prefecture
Japanese men's volleyball players
Setters (volleyball)
21st-century Japanese people